DWCM (1161 AM) Aksyon Radyo is a radio station owned by Manila Broadcasting Company through its licensee Philippine Broadcasting Corporation and operated by Balon Subol Broadcast Marketing Corporation. The station's studio is located at the 2nd floor, Duque Bldg., Galvan St., Brgy. II, Dagupan, and its transmitter is located at Brgy. Lucao, Dagupan.

References

Radio stations in Dagupan
Radio stations established in 2004
News and talk radio stations in the Philippines